Robert Paparemborde (5 July 1948 in Féas, France – 19 April 2001) was a French rugby union player and administrator. He was capped 55 times, five as captain, at prop for the French national side. Paparemborde represented Pau for all but the last year of his club career,  when he won the 1990 national championship with Racing Club of Paris.

A tighthead prop with sloping shoulders and very strong upper body, Paparemborde was nicknamed the "Bear of the Pyrenees" or "Patou". He did not make his debut for France until he was 27. However, he established himself as one of the greatest prop-forwards of any generation.Wales and Lions prop, Graham Price, said that Paparemborde was good in every element of rugby.

He was a member of the French team that won the Five Nations Championship in 1977 (Grand Slam), 1981 (Grand Slam) and 1983.

Paparemborde represented the Barbarians against Scotland in 1983. He also played for a World XV on 9 August 1980 against  in Buenos Aires, losing 36-22.

Paparemborde was later vice-president of French rugby.

He died of pancreatic cancer on 19 April 2001 in Paris.

Notes 

1948 births
2001 deaths
Sportspeople from Pyrénées-Atlantiques
French rugby union players
France international rugby union players
Rugby union props
Racing 92 players
Section Paloise players